Old Faridabad is an elevated station on the Violet Line of the Delhi Metro. It is located between Badkhal Mor and Neelam Chowk Ajronda station on Line 6 (Violet Line).

This metro station is closest to Faridabad railway station.

Station layout

Facilities
The station has ticket vending machines, Sulabh Sochalaya (washroom) and a Milk booth.

Connections
Faridabad railway station of the Indian Railways network situated nearby. Faridabad is part of the Delhi Suburban Railway and is served by local trains. This stations serves the areas of Old Faridabad and nearby areas including Sector 16, 17, 18. The station is also served by local autos and rickshaw for nearby connectivity.

Entry/exit

See also

Delhi
Faridabad
Haryana
National Highway 44 (India)
List of Delhi Metro stations
Transport in Delhi
Delhi Metro Rail Corporation
Delhi Suburban Railway
Delhi Monorail
Delhi Transport Corporation
Faridabad district
New Delhi
National Capital Region (India)
National Capital Region Transport Corporation
List of rapid transit systems
List of metro systems

References

External links

 Delhi Metro Rail Corporation Ltd. (Official site) 
 Delhi Metro Annual Reports
 
 UrbanRail.Net – Descriptions of all metro systems in the world, each with a schematic map showing all stations.

2015 establishments in Haryana
Delhi Metro stations
Railway stations in India opened in 2015
Railway stations in Faridabad district